The Prince George Cougars are a Canadian major junior ice hockey team currently members of the B.C. Division of the Western Conference in the Western Hockey League (WHL). The team is based in Prince George, British Columbia, and plays its home games at the CN Centre, formally known as the Prince George Multiplex. The Cougars were founded in 1971 as the Victoria Cougars, but later moved to Prince George in 1994, becoming the northernmost franchise in the Canadian Hockey League. On March 19, 2014, after months of rumours, a team of local investors led by Greg Pocock, along with NHLers Dan Hamhuis and Eric Brewer, agreed in principle to purchase the Prince George Cougars. The deal was approved by the WHL Board of Governors on April 30 the same year.

History

The Prince George Cougars played the 1994–95 season at the Prince George Coliseum, along the Tier II Prince George Spruce Kings, until the construction of the team's own arena was complete. The Cougars' logo for their first season in Prince George closely resembled that of the Victoria Cougars'. For the 1995–96 season, the Cougars moved into their new home, the Prince George Multiplex, since renamed the CN Centre. A new logo was also unveiled the same season.

The Cougars first made the playoffs in the 1996–97 WHL season under coach Stan Butler. The Cougars' most successful playoff run came during the 2006–07 season. Prince George achieved their first sweep of the Kamloops Blazers in a best-of-seven-game series, proceeded to defeat the top-ranked Everett Silvertips in six games and reached the Western Conference finals for the third time, which they ultimately they lost in five games to the eventual 2007 Memorial Cup champions, the Vancouver Giants.

2014 sale
After months of rumours, it was announced on March 19 that a team of local investors led by Greg Pocock, along with current NHLers and former Cougars Dan Hamhuis and Eric Brewer, had agreed in principle to purchase the Prince George Cougars. The price of the sale was undisclosed, and the official confirmation of the sale occurred on April 30 after approval from the WHL Board of Governors. Cougars owner Rick Brodsky and vice president Brandi Brodsky declined to comment at the time of the sale.

Season-by-season record
Note: GP = Games played, W = Wins, L = Losses, T = Ties, OTL = Overtime losses, GF = Goals for, GA = Goals against

Team records

Current roster
Updated March 3, 2023.

 

  
  

 

  
 

 

 

 

 

|}

NHL alumni
The following alumni of the Prince George Cougars have played in the National Hockey League.

Uniforms and logos

The Cougars colours are red, white and black. Home jerseys have a white upper portion, with a burgundy lower portion, separated by a diagonal black stripe. Away jerseys have a black upper portion, with a burgundy lower portion, separated by a diagonal white stripe. Prince George's third jersey features a redesigned logo (inset), on a burgundy jersey, with black, grey and white trim on the lower portion. On August 20, 2008, the Cougars unveiled a new logo, resembling closer to the third logo than the second, and was designed by Mike Doran of Splash Media.

See also
List of ice hockey teams in British Columbia

References

External links
Prince George Cougars website
Western Hockey League website

Ice hockey clubs established in 1994
Western Hockey League teams
Ice hockey teams in British Columbia
Sport in Prince George, British Columbia
1994 establishments in British Columbia